Larry Canada (born December 16, 1954) is a former American football running back in the National Football League and the United States Football League. He played professionally for the Denver Broncos, Denver Gold, Chicago Blitz, and the San Antonio Gunslingers.

Early life
Canada was born in Chicago, Illinois and attended Austin High School. He played college football at University of Wisconsin–Madison.

Professional career
He played three seasons in the NFL with the Denver Broncos in 1978, 1979 and 1981. After leaving the NFL, he played in the United States Football League for the Denver Gold (1983),
 the Chicago Blitz (1984-1985) and the San Antonio Gunslingers (1985).

References

External links 	
 Remember the USFL
 Larry Canada Playing for Chicago Blitz

1954 births
Players of American football from Chicago
Denver Broncos players
Denver Gold players
Chicago Blitz players
San Antonio Gunslingers players
American football running backs
Wisconsin Badgers football players
Living people